George Prime is a politician from the island of Grenada.  He served as that nation's Minister of Carriacou and Petit Martinique Affairs between 2008 and 2013.

References
Ministry webpage

Living people
Ministers of Carriacou and Petite Martinique Affairs 
Members of the Senate of Grenada
Government ministers of Grenada
National Democratic Congress (Grenada) politicians
Alumni of the University of London
1953 births
Aruban emigrants to Grenada